Kennedy Heights Park is an urban park in the Kennedy Heights neighborhood of Cincinnati, Ohio, United States. The  park was established in 1930. It features an historic 1937 shelter, playground and soccer field.

References

Parks in Cincinnati